WASP-37 is a yellow main sequence star in the constellation of Virgo.

Star characteristics 
WASP-37 has a low metallicity of just 40% of solar, and is likely older than Sun. WASP-37 does not have noticeable flare activity.

Planetary system 
The "Hot Jupiter" class planet WASP-37b was discovered around WASP-37 in 2010. The study in 2018 has found the stability of orbits in habitable zone of WASP-37 is not significantly affected by WASP-37b planet.

References 

Planetary systems with one confirmed planet
Virgo (constellation)
G-type main-sequence stars
Planetary transit variables
37
J14474655+0103538